Stanwell Power Station is a coal-fired power generation station located in Stanwell,  south-west of Rockhampton, Queensland, Australia. At the time of construction, it was one of the largest industrial developments undertaken in Queensland. With a capacity to generate 1,445 megawatts (MW), Stanwell Power Station supplies electricity for distribution to customers via the state's high voltage electricity grid.

Stanwell was commissioned in 1992 and became fully operational in 1996. It is located on 4,000 acres (1,600 hectares) of land. Construction of the station took seven years, with infrastructure built to withstand cyclonic winds.

Fuel
Coal is transport via rail from several Central Queensland coal mines.  About 4 million tons of coal are used each year.

Design
There are four generating units at Stanwell Power Station. The four units and their components are housed in a 20 storey boiler house and a turbine hall the length of three football fields. The power station is highly automated and achieves both an efficient, effective workplace and high asset performance through the application of innovative technology and organisational design. These innovations have been recognised both nationally and internationally. Stanwell Power Station previously held the world record at 1,073 days of continuous operation on Unit 4. This was surpassed in 2021 by Canadian public entity Ontario Power Generation's Darlington Nuclear Generating Station Unit 1, which ran for 1,106 days continuous.

The station features a 210-metre-high-chimney stack which was constructed using approximately 750,000 bricks. The station has two cooling towers, each stands 130 metres high (about the height of a 40-storey building) and is 100 metres in diameter. Fifteen thousand cubic metres of concrete was poured for each tower. The plume seen coming from the cooling towers is steam, lost through evaporation during the water-cooling process.

See also

List of active power stations in Queensland

References

External links

Coal-fired power stations in Queensland
Rockhampton Region
Power stations in Queensland
Energy infrastructure completed in 1996
1996 establishments in Australia
Buildings and structures in Central Queensland